Kochaisa are a subdivision of the Kurmi caste.

In 18th century this community had migrated from Kutch, Gujarat province of India and settled in and around Patna, Bihar.

Caste
Social groups of Bihar